"Il Pulcino Pio" (in English version titled as "The Little Chick Cheep") is an Italian song released as a single on 18 July 2012 on Globo Records by the Rome radio station Radio Globo. The song was interpreted by Morgana Giovannetti, an actress and host of the station.

The song became a hit single in Italy topping the FIMI Singles Chart and staying at top for 8 consecutive weeks (2012 August–October). It also became a hit in France, Spain, the Netherlands, and other European countries in their respective local language versions.

It is a remake of a Brazilian children's song from the 1950s post-war period, known by various names, including "Na Minha Casa Tem...", "A Minha Velha (Tem um Pintinho)", "O Pintinho Piu."

Background
The rights to the song were acquired by Globo Records S.r.l. The song was produced by Bruno Benvenuti and Max Moroldo. Lyrics were translated into Italian by Bruno Benvenuti, Lucio Scarpa, Alessandro Tirocchi, and Maurizio Paniconi. Vocals were provided by Morgana Giovannetti.

Radio Globo had previously scored a hit by releasing its own version of "Mr. Saxobeat," featuring Maurizio Paniconi, Alessandro Tirocchi, and Morgana Giovannetti and produced by Lucio Scarpa. Named "Radio Globo Morning Show - Mr. Saxobeat Ostia Beach version") , the Radio Globo Italian version. 

The station followed up with "Il pulcino Pio," featuring Morgana Giovannetti, during their Morning Show, based on a Brazilian tune. In similar fashion to "Old MacDonald Had a Farm," "Il pulcino Pio" features sounds of a hen, a rooster, a turkey, a pigeon, a cat, a dog, a goat, a lamb, a cow and a bull. However, in the Portuguese version, a deer is included, and the pigeon is replaced with a guinea fowl. The song culminates with a tractor hitting and running over the chirping chick.

Reception 
After the huge success of the Italian version of the song, a more racy faster version was produced with an accompanying music video by Do It Yourself Multimedia Group S.r.l. with animation created by Federico Mancosu. It was launched online in May 2012. The YouTube music video for the Spanish version of the song attracted more than 6 million views in the three months that followed and has been viewed over 1.3 billion times as of February 2020. After the popularity of the single in France, a compilation album was released in February 2013 called Piou Piou Dance Party (2013) featuring a number of local French and international hits of the previous year. The album entered the SNEP French Albums Chart at #10 in its first week of release.

On 17 September 2012, Radio Globo launched an alternative version called "La Vendetta" in which the chirping chick takes revenge on the tractor that ran over it in the original music video. The Pulcino Pio character and distinctive voice was used in other releases as well in different settings. For example, the follow-up single "Superstar"  features Pulcino Pio, now a big star.

Charts
Besides Italy, the song has charted in other countries. In November 2012, the French station NRJ promoted the song heavily resulting in chart success in France.

Weekly charts

Year-end charts

Certifications

References

2012 songs
2012 YouTube videos
Italian-language songs
Italian children's songs
Novelty songs
Songs about cats
Songs about dogs
Songs about cattle
Songs about sheep
Songs about birds
Number-one singles in Italy
Internet memes
Internet memes introduced in 2012
Cumulative songs
Nursery rhymes of uncertain origin
Traditional children's songs
1950s songs
Fictional chickens
Songwriter unknown
Works of uncertain authorship
Year of song unknown